Morris L. Overstreet is a judge. He is the first African-American elected to a statewide office in the history of the State of Texas. He was twice elected to serve on the state's highest criminal appellate court, Texas Court of Criminal Appeals, from 1990 to 1998. As a member of the court, he authored over 500 opinions.

Education
Overstreet is a graduate of Amarillo High School in Amarillo. He earned a Bachelor of Arts degree in Sociology with minors in Biology and Chemistry from Angelo State University in San Angelo, Texas. He earned a Juris Doctor Degree from Texas Southern University School of Law in Houston, Texas in 1975.

Career
Before taking the bench, Overstreet served for five years as a prosecutor in the 47th Judicial District at the District Attorney’s Office in Amarillo, where he advanced to first assistant district attorney. He also presided over the Potter County Court at Law Number 1 in Amarillo for four years. As a prosecutor and trial judge involved in hundreds of jury trials and thousands of non-jury trials, Overstreet has never had a criminal conviction reversed on appeal because of any error committed by him. 

In January 1999, he qualified as a certified contract advisor with the National Football League Players Association and was authorized to negotiate contracts between players and NFL clubs. He is a life member of the National Bar Association and is also a member of the American Bar Association, and served as a former chair of the Judicial Council Division. Overstreet is also the current president of the Auxiliary to the National Medical Association.

From August 1999 – May 2000, he served as the distinguished visiting professor of law at his alma mater, Thurgood Marshall School of Law, Texas Southern University in Houston, Texas. In September 2002, Overstreet returned to Texas Southern University, where he served as the director of the Legal Clinic and professor of evidence and criminal procedure for four years.

In private practice, Overstreet has served as general counsel to the Texas State Baptist Convention and chair of its statewide Bible Drill Competition. He also served as the national legal counsel for Phi Beta Sigma fraternity and was a former chair of the State Bar Crime Victims Committee.

Memberships
Overstreet is a member of Mount Zion Baptist Church in Amarillo, Texas, and attends Windsor Village United Methodist Church. He is also a life member of both the National Association for the Advancement of Colored People and Phi Beta Sigma fraternity. He is also a member of Sigma Pi Phi Fraternity. He is a frequent lecturer and public speaker and has taught continuing legal educational classes statewide for justices of the peace, Constitutional county judges, municipal court judges, local bar associations, the State Bar of Texas Advance Criminal Law Seminar, and the National Bar Association.

See also
List of African-American jurists

External links
Official Website for the Texas Court of Criminal Appeals
Faculty profile at Texas Southern University School of Law

Texas state court judges
African-American judges
Angelo State University alumni
Texas Southern University alumni
Texas Southern University faculty
Living people
1951 births
Thurgood Marshall School of Law alumni
Judges of the Texas Court of Criminal Appeals
21st-century African-American people
20th-century African-American people